Amphibulima patula is a species of air-breathing land snail, a terrestrial pulmonate gastropod mollusk in the family Amphibulimidae.

Subspecies 
Subspecies of Amphibulima patula include:
 Amphibulima patula patula (Bruguière, 1792)
 Amphibulima patula dominicensis Pilsbry, 1899 - Pilsbry (1899) separated the Dominican specimens on the basis of the darker colour and by having a heavier sculptured shell. Robinson et al. (2009) have found living specimens that were either light beige-coloured with a somewhat orange-yellowish line along the foot (see photo on the left), or entirely dark brown coloured (see photo on the right).

Comparison of orange-yellowish and dark brown Amphibulima patula dominicensis:

Distribution 
The nominate taxon Amphibulima patula patula has been reported from Guadeloupe (probably now extinct) and Marie-Galante. The type locality is Guadeloupe.

Amphibulima patula dominicensis is endemic to Dominica.

Another variety has been reported from Saint Kitts and Saba.

Description 
Amphibulima patula has large foot, that is not completely retracted into the shell in living specimen. But when the live animal is immersed into the preserving fluid, then it retracts completely within the shell.

Adult snail is about 2.5 cm. It is called a slug-like snail because the shell is relatively small in proportion to the body and with one large, ear-like whorl and two small whorls. Color is yellowish brown.

This species could be confused with the common amber snails (Succinea), especially the juveniles. The Amphibulima has much coarser sculpture than the amber snails.

The jaw and radula of Amphibulima patula dominicensis was described by Bland & Binney in 1874.

Ecology 
Amphibulima patula dominicensis is frequently found on banana and Citrus plants, where it may feed on the leaves. They also eat leaves of Virginia pepperweed Lepidium virginicum and Cakile lanceolata. They eat lettuce in captivity.

References
This article incorporates public domain text from the reference  and CC-BY-3.0 text from the reference  and a public domain work of the United States Government from the reference.

External links 

 Photos of Amphibulima patula from St. Kitts
 Photo of Amphibulima patula dominicensis from Dominica
 Photos of juveniles Amphibulima patula dominicensis from Dominica * (Identification of the photo)
 Photo of Amphibulima patula dominicensis from Dominica + another photo

Amphibulimidae
Gastropods described in 1792